This is a list of 147 of the peaks and climbing destinations in Idaho's Sawtooth Range.

See also

 List of mountains of Idaho
 List of mountain peaks of Idaho
 List of mountain ranges in Idaho

Notes 
1.Baron Spire collapsed following a 4.2 magnitude earthquake in August 2020.

References

Peaks
Sawtooth National Forest
Sawtooth Range (Idaho)